Papilio okinawensis, the Okinawa peacock, is a species of swallowtail butterfly from the genus Papilio that is found in Japan.

References

okinawensis
Butterflies described in 1898
Butterflies of Japan
Taxa named by Hans Fruhstorfer